Vina Vidai Vettai Juniors Season 2 ( 'Question, answer, hunt') is an Indian Tamil-language quiz show broadcast on Puthuyugam TV from 13 September 2015 to 3 January 2016 aired every Sunday 12:00PM IST for 16 episode.

The quiz show for school students particularly from grades 8 to 12. The idea of this program would be to enable students to make them think beyond their text books. It is a quiz show designed to test knowledge of Indian culture, sports, politics, history and current affairs. The Show host by Vijay Adhiraj.

Chettinad Vidyashram, Chennai emerged victorious in the finale.

References

External links
 Puthuyugam TV official website 
 Puthuyugam TV on YouTube
 Vina Vidai Vettai Facebook page

2015 Indian television seasons
2016 Indian television seasons